Sublime to the Ridiculous is the only studio album by the British hard rock band Sheer Greed, released in 1992 in Japan.

Track listing
 "First to Admit"
 "Everybody Wants"
 "Blue Favours"
 "War Baby"
 "No Way Out"
 "Let Me Down Gently"
 "Rita's Dirty Hideaway"
 "I Ain't Afraid"
 "Dying Inside"
 "No Fun"
 "Baby Gets Kix"
 "Hollywood Tease '92" (Girl cover)

Personnel
Band members
 Gerry Laffy - lead vocals, guitar
 Neil Gabbitas - guitar
 Simon Laffy - bass
 Pete Barnacle - drums

Guest musicians
 Phil Lewis - mid 8 vocals on track 2
 Phil Collen - backing vocals and guitar on track 2, solo track 4, solo track 8, solo track 12

References

1992 debut albums
Sheer Greed (band) albums